Laboratory for Visionary Architecture (LAVA) is an international think tank set up in 2007 with a focus on research and design. Its stated goal is to reposition architecture at the forefront of cultural, technological and social change.

Activities 
LAVA takes their inspiration from nature, using the principle of biomimetics. LAVA projects feature intelligent systems and skins that respond to air pressure, temperature, humidity, solar-radiation and pollution. LAVA uses computation to simulate this natural behavior of growth and adaptation of species.

It maintains offices in, Stuttgart, Berlin, Beijing, Riyadh, and Sydney. The group has three directors, Tobias Wallisser  is based in Berlin, Alexander Rieck  is based in Stuttgart while Chris Bosse is based in Sydney.

Projects 

 Installations such as the lycra Green Void
 Set for the 2009 MTV Video Music Awards
 Winner of the competition design for the city centre of the -free city Masdar in Abu Dhabi
 ‘Reskinning’ of the UTS building in Sydney
 LAVA's Martian Embassy in Sydney houses shop and writing classes for kids in an immersive space
 International competition held by the Federal Sport Commission, Ethiopia to design a new FIFA and Olympic-standard 60,000-seat stadium and sports village in Addis Ababa. Construction commences in 2014.
 Tower Skin
 Snowflake Tower
 Bionic Tower

Awards 

 Awards include the Australian Interior Design Award
 UN partnered ZEROprize Re-Skinning Award
 I. D. Annual Design Review, IDEA Award
 AAFAB AA London, Cityscape Dubai Award Sustainability
 Commendations include the Well-Tech Award (Italy) and the Dedalo Minosse International Prize.

References

Think tanks established in 2007
Think tanks based in Australia
2007 establishments in Australia